Cirrothaumatia tornocarpa is a species of moth of the  family Tortricidae. It is found in Panama.

References

Moths described in 1932
Cochylini